The Wiltshire Premier Shield is a single county cup competition involving English football clubs based in the county of Wiltshire.

The current competition format operates with a two-leg semi-final and a single match final during the latter stages of the league season.

The most successful team in the competition's history is Swindon Town who have won the shield 27 times. Swindon Town are the only Wiltshire representative in the Football League and have often used the Wiltshire Shield to field their youths, reserves and players who are returning from injury.

The competition consists of the highest placed clubs in Wiltshire from professional to Step 5.

Wiltshire Senior Challenge Cup

Wiltshire Premier Shield winners

References 

County Cup competitions
Football in Wiltshire
Recurring sporting events established in 1926